Curicaberis is a genus of huntsman spiders that was first described by C. A. Rheims in 2015.

Species
 it contains thirty-two species, found in Central America, Mexico, the United States, and Brazil:
Curicaberis abnormis (Keyserling, 1884) – USA, Mexico
Curicaberis annulatus (F. O. Pickard-Cambridge, 1900) – Mexico
Curicaberis azul Rheims, 2015 – Mexico
Curicaberis bagaces Rheims, 2015 – Costa Rica
Curicaberis bibranchiatus (Fox, 1937) – USA, Mexico
Curicaberis catarinas Rheims, 2015 – Mexico
Curicaberis chamela Rheims, 2015 – Mexico
Curicaberis chiapas Rheims, 2015 – Mexico, Guatemala
Curicaberis culiacan Rheims, 2015 – Mexico
Curicaberis cuyutlan Rheims, 2015 – Mexico
Curicaberis durango Rheims, 2015 – Mexico
Curicaberis eberhardi Rheims, 2015 – Mexico
Curicaberis elpunto Rheims, 2015 – Mexico
Curicaberis ensiger (F. O. Pickard-Cambridge, 1900) – Mexico
Curicaberis ferrugineus (C. L. Koch, 1836) (type) – USA, Mexico, Guatemala, Brazil
Curicaberis granada Rheims, 2015 – Nicaragua, Costa Rica
Curicaberis huitiupan Rheims, 2015 – Mexico
Curicaberis jalisco Rheims, 2015 – Mexico
Curicaberis luctuosus (Banks, 1898) – Mexico
Curicaberis manifestus (O. Pickard-Cambridge, 1890) – Mexico, Guatemala, Costa Rica
Curicaberis minax (O. Pickard-Cambridge, 1896) – Mexico
Curicaberis mitla Rheims, 2015 – Mexico
Curicaberis pedregal Rheims, 2015 – Mexico
Curicaberis peninsulanus (Banks, 1898) – USA, Mexico
Curicaberis potosi Rheims, 2015 – Mexico
Curicaberis puebla Rheims, 2015 – Mexico
Curicaberis sanpedrito Rheims, 2015 – Mexico
Curicaberis tepic Rheims, 2015 – Mexico
Curicaberis tortugero Rheims, 2015 – Mexico
Curicaberis urquizai Rheims, 2015 – Mexico
Curicaberis yerba Rheims, 2015 – Mexico
Curicaberis zapotec Rheims, 2015 – Mexico

In synonymy:
C. albinus (Fox, 1937, T from Olios) = Curicaberis abnormis (Keyserling, 1884)
C. naturalisticus (Chamberlin, 1924, T from Olios) = Curicaberis abnormis (Keyserling, 1884)
C. positivus (Chamberlin, 1924, T from Olios) = Curicaberis peninsulanus (Banks, 1898)
C. scepticus (Chamberlin, 1924, T from Olios) = Curicaberis peninsulanus (Banks, 1898)
C. schistus (Chamberlin, 1919, T from Olios) = Curicaberis peninsulanus (Banks, 1898)

See also
 List of Sparassidae species

References

Araneomorphae genera
Sparassidae
Spiders of Central America
Spiders of North America